Capital Circle is a circular road surrounding Capital Hill in the centre of Canberra, Australia's capital city. It is one of three concentric roads on the hill, with State Circle the outermost and Parliament Drive the innermost. There are no buildings on Capital Circle. Parliament Drive surrounds New Parliament House.

Roads named for each of Australia's state capitals converge at Capital Circle or State Circle. The main roads leading from the circle are Commonwealth Avenue to the north and Canberra Avenue and Adelaide Avenue to the south.

Design 
Capital Circle is a three-lane road. All traffic runs in a clockwise direction. A short section under Federation Mall is in tunnel. The road does not form a complete circle, as a section under Commonwealth Avenue was closed a few years after opening due to the high number of crashes apparently resulting partly from the closeness of the entrance from Commonwealth Avenue and the exit to Kings Avenue.  Vehicles are now forced to exit at Commonwealth Avenue.

See also

References 

Streets in Canberra